The 1996 E3 Harelbeke was the 39th edition of the E3 Harelbeke cycle race and was held on 30 March 1996. The race started and finished in Harelbeke. The race was won by Carlo Bomans of the Mapei team.

General classification

References

1996 in Belgian sport
1996